Franz Anton Ritter von Gerstner (11 May 1796 in Prague – 12 April 1840 in Philadelphia, Pennsylvania, United States) was a German-Bohemian civil engineer, professor and railway pioneer.

Career
The son of physicist and railway pioneer Franz Josef Gerstner, Franz Anton von Gerstner studied engineering, philosophy, technology and mechanical engineering at the Polytechnic in Prague. From 1817 he taught practical geometry and land surveying as a professor at the Vienna Polytechnic Institute.

From 1820 he worked with his father on the pioneering project of the Budweis to Linz section of a Danube–Vltava railway and in 1822 made his first trip to England to study railway construction. In 1824 he resigned his professorship in accordance with his contract and became construction manager for the Budweis–Linz–Gmunden horse-drawn wagonway in the Eisenhut/Kerschbaum area. In this capacity he made a second study trip to England in 1826/27. In 1828 he left the construction because of growing differences of opinion with the shareholders of the operating company on the construction process, which was becoming more costly than planned. The railway line was completed by Matthias von Schönerer and opened on 1 August 1832. 

von Gerstner continued to work in railway construction. In 1829 he undertook a third study trip to England and in 1834 became the planning officer for several railway lines in the Russian Empire, where in 1836/37 he realized the Tsarskoye Selo Railway which opened from Saint Petersburg on 30 October 1837. From 1838 he studied the North American railway system on behalf of representatives of the Russian tsarist court and in his own interest.

Personal life

His first marriage was to Marquise Josefine von Lambolin (Lambelin) (1805–1835). His second was to Klara (1813–after 1881), daughter of Friedrich von Epple (1782–1848), a public official in Frankfurt am Main, and she gave birth to their daughter Philadelphia von Gerstner in 1839. He died shortly before his 44th birthday in Philadelphia.

In 1903, Gerstnerstraße in Vienna was named after him.

Technical achievement
The technical achievement of Franz Anton von Gerstner mainly consists in giving a clear rejection of the "inclined plane system" (with a cable for overcoming large differences in gradient) favoured by English engineers like George Stephenson on his first trip to England (1822). Inspired by road construction, he pleaded for a technically integrated railway system. In his opinion, a railroad should have special attention paid to even gradients, achieved through strategic installation of embankments or cuts and viaducts. 
Gerstner is therefore to be regarded as the forefather of the mountain railway, all the more so as he actually built one in the shape of the Budweis–Linz–Gmunden railway, but as he had left its construction before completion, his performance was initially not publicly recognized. In the course of the modernization of the railway (1869–1872/73), however, it was abandoned. Today only remains (e.g. the Great Edlbrucker Bridge) are preserved as relics. Years later, Carl Ritter von Ghega expressed the same planning idea and implemented it on the Semmering railway with publicly recognized success.

In England, too, a country that was progressive in railroad construction at the time, the planning companies finally moved away from inclined planes. Gerstner's great technical and theoretical merit is only briefly mentioned in recent literature; an exception is the publication Die Erste (österreichische) Eisenbahngesellschaft und ihr Netz (2008) by Elmar Oberegger.

Publications
 Lehrgegenstände der praktischen Geometrie am polytechnischen Institut, Prag, 1818.
 Über die Vortheile der Anlage einer Eisenbahn zwischen der Moldau und Donau. Wien, 1824.
 Bericht an die P.T. Herren Actionärs über den Stand der k. k. privilegierten Eisenbahn-Unternehmung zwischen der Moldau und Donau, vom Bauführer Franz Anton Ritter von Gerstner. Wien, Dezember 1827.
 Über die Vortheile der Unternehmung einer Eisenbahn zwischen der Moldau und Donau. Wien, Februar 1829.
 Handbuch der Mechanik. von Franz Joseph Ritter von Gerstner. Aufgesetzt, mit Beitr. von neuern englischen Konstruktionen vermehrt u. hrsg. von Franz Anton Ritter von Gerstner. Wien 1831–1834.
 Bericht über den Stand der Unternehmung der Eisenbahn von St. Petersburg nach Zarskoje Selo. 1838.
 Berichte aus den Vereinigten Staaten von Nordamerica, über Eisenbahnen, Dampfschiffahrten, Banken und andere öffentliche Unternehmungen. C. P. Melzer, Leipzig 1839.
 Die innern Communicationen der Vereinigten Staaten von Nordamerika. Wien 1842–1843.

Further reading
 Heribert Sturm: Biographisches Lexikon zur Geschichte der böhmischen Länder. Herausgegeben im Auftrag des Collegium Carolinum (Institut), Bd. I, R. Oldenbourg Verlag München Wien 1979, S. 431 f.
 Wilhelm Kosch: Das katholische Deutschland (1933–1939).
 Hubert Partisch: Österreicher aus deutschen Stamm. I (1961) – 7 (1970), Band 3.
 Constantin von Wurzbach: "Gerstner, Franz Anton Ritter von". In: Biographisches Lexikon des Kaiserthums Oesterreich. 5. Theil. Verlag der typogr.-literar.-artist. Anstalt (L. C. Zamarski & C. Dittmarsch.), Wien 1859, S. 160 f
 Erich Gierach (Hrsg.): Sudetendeutsche Lebensbilder. (Drei Bände), Band 1, 1926, S. 271 ff.
 Karl Karmarsch: "Gerstner, Franz Anton Ritter von". In: Allgemeine Deutsche Biographie (ADB). Band 9, Duncker & Humblot, Leipzig 1879, S. 69 f.
 Bruno Enderes: "Die Holz- und Eisenbahn Budweis–Linz. Das erste Werk deutscher Eisenbahnbaukunst". In: Beiträge zur Geschichte der Technik und Industrie. Jahrbuch des Vereines Deutscher Ingenieure 16, 1926, S. 13–64.
 Josef Hons: František Antonín Gerstner. Orbis Prag 1948, (Kdo je 118.
 "Gerstner, Franz Anton von". In: Österreichisches Biographisches Lexikon 1815–1950 (ÖBL). Band 1, Verlag der Österreichischen Akademie der Wissenschaften, Wien 1957, S. 430.
 Paul Mechtler: "Gerstner, Franz Anton Ritter von". In: Neue Deutsche Biographie (NDB). Band 6, Duncker & Humblot, Berlin 1964, S. 329 f
 Elmar Oberegger: Die erste (österreichische) Eisenbahngesellschaft und ihr Netz. 1824–1903. Eigenverlag – Info-Büro für Österreichischen Eisenbahngeschichte, Sattledt 2008, (Veröffentlichungen des Info-Büros für Österreichische Eisenbahngeschichte 2008, 5).
 Karl-Eugen Kurrer: Geschichte der Baustatik. Auf der Suche nach dem Gleichgewicht. Ernst & Sohn, Berlin 2016, S. 47–48 u. S. 414–415, .

References

External links
 Professor Franz Anton Ritter von Gerstner in den USA (1838–1840)
 Erste (Österreichische) Eisenbahngeselleschaft (with maps)
 Literature by and about Franz Anton von Gerstner in the catalog of the German National Library

Engineers from Prague
Railway civil engineers
Austrian railway pioneers
Austrian knights
1796 births
1840 deaths